Charles Pope can refer to:

 Charles Pope (1883–1917), Australian recipient of the Victoria Cross
 Charles Pope (English cricketer) (1872–1959), English cricketer
 Charles Pope (South African cricketer) (born 1946), South African cricketer
 Charles G. Pope (died 1893), American lawyer